XHNA-FM (105.9 MHz) is a radio station in Matamoros, Tamaulipas, Mexico.

History
XHNA received its concession on November 28, 1988. It was owned by Radiorama subsidiary Radiofonía Mexicana, S.A. Radiorama transferred the station to a new concessionaire in 2008.

References

External links

 radioavanzado.com
 raiostationworld.com; Radio stations in the Rio Grande Valley

Spanish-language radio stations
Radio stations in Matamoros, Tamaulipas